The 2019-20 Brown Bears Men's ice hockey season was the 103rd season of play for the program and the 59th season in the ECAC Hockey conference. The Bears represented Brown University and were coached by Brendan Whittet, in his 11th season.

Departures

Recruiting

Roster
As of July 10, 2019.

|}

Standings

Schedule and Results

|-
!colspan=12 style=";" | Regular Season

|-
!colspan=12 style=";" | 

|- align="center" bgcolor="#e0e0e0"
|colspan=12|Brown Lost Series 0–2

Scoring statistics

Goaltending statistics

Rankings

References

Brown Bears men's ice hockey seasons
Brown Bears
Brown Bears
2019 in sports in Rhode Island
2020 in sports in Rhode Island